Zaleszany may refer to the following places:
Zaleszany, Białystok County in Podlaskie Voivodeship (north-east Poland)
Zaleszany, Hajnówka County in Podlaskie Voivodeship (north-east Poland)
Zaleszany, Subcarpathian Voivodeship (south-east Poland)